
Year 1541 (MDXLI) was a common year starting on Saturday (link will display the full calendar) of the Julian calendar.

Events 

 January–June 
 February 12 – Pedro de Valdivia founds Santiago del Nuevo Extremo, which will become the capital of Chile.
 April 7 – Francis Xavier leaves Lisbon, on a mission to the Portuguese East Indies.
 April 24 – Battle of Sahart: Gelawdewos is defeated by the forces of Imam Ahmad ibn Ibrahim al-Ghazi.
 May 8 – Spanish explorer Hernando de Soto reaches the Mississippi River, naming it the Rio de Espiritu Santo ("River of the Holy Spirit").
 May 23 – Jacques Cartier departs from Saint-Malo, France on his third voyage.
 June 18 – By the Crown of Ireland Act, the Parliament of Ireland declares King Henry VIII of England and his heirs to be Kings of Ireland, replacing the Lordship of Ireland with the Kingdom of Ireland.

 July–December 
 July 9 — Estêvão da Gama departs Massawa, leaving behind 400 matchlock men and 150 slaves under his brother Cristóvão da Gama, with orders to assist the Emperor of Ethiopia to defeat Ahmad ibn Ibrahim al-Ghazi, who has invaded his Empire.
 August 29 — The Janissaries of Suleiman the Magnificent take Buda by ruse, hiding themselves as visitors.
 September 9–11 — Spanish noblewoman Beatriz de la Cueva serves as governor of the colony of Guatemala, before she is killed in a mudslide from Volcán de Agua, which ruins the capital city, Ciudad Vieja.
 September 13 — After three years of exile, John Calvin returns to Geneva to reform the church under a body of doctrine that comes to be known as Calvinism.
 October 7th — Through royal decree, the city of Arequipa is granted its coat of arms.
 October–November — Charles V, Holy Roman Emperor / Charles I of Spain personally leads a disastrous expedition against the Regency of Algiers.

 Date unknown 
 Ottoman Sultan Suleiman the Magnificent seals off The Golden Gate in Jerusalem.
 Iceland adopts the Lutheran faith.
 Gerardus Mercator makes his first globe.
 The first official translation of the entire Bible into Swedish is made.
 John Calvin translates his Institutio Christianae religionis into French, as L'Institution chrétienne.
 Elia Levita's chivalric romance, the Bovo-Bukh, is first printed, the earliest published secular work in Yiddish.

Births 
 January 24 – Magdalena Moons, Dutch woman associated with the 1574 Siege of Leiden (d. 1613)
 January 26 – Florent Chrestien, French writer (d. 1596)
 February 21 – Philipp V, Count of Hanau-Lichtenberg (d. 1599)
 March 25 – Francesco I de' Medici, Grand Duke of Tuscany (d. 1587)
 April 8 – Michele Mercati, Italian physician and gardener (d. 1593)
 April 12 – Ipatii Potii, Metropolitan of Kiev (d. 1613)
 September 7 
 Luigi Groto, Italian lutenist and poet (d. 1588)
 Hernando de Cabezón, Spanish musician (d. 1602)
 September 16 – Walter Devereux, 1st Earl of Essex, English nobleman (d. 1576)
 September 17 – Roberto de' Nobili, Italian Catholic cardinal (d. 1559)
 September 21 – Anna of Nassau-Dillenburg, Countess consort of Nassau-Weilburg (d. 1616)
 November 9 – Menso Alting, Dutch preacher and reformer (d. 1612)
 November 25 – Michele Bonelli, Italian Catholic cardinal (d. 1598)
 December 12 – Johann Bauhin, Swiss botanist (d. 1613)
 date unknown
 Pierre Charron, French philosopher (d. 1603)
 El Greco, or Domênikos Theotokópoulos (Greek: Δομήνικος Θεοτοκόπουλος), Cretian painter, sculptor and architect (d. 1614)
 Hatano Hideharu, Japanese samurai (d. 1579)
 Mizuno Tadashige, Japanese nobleman (d. 1600)
 Guðbrandur Þorláksson, Icelandic mathematician (d. 1627)
 Hattori Hanzō, Japanese ninja who served under Tokugawa Ieyasu (d. 1596)

Deaths 

 January 2 – Wang Gen, Chinese philosopher (b. 1483)
 January 5 – Philip of the Palatinate, Bishop of Freising and Naumburg (b. 1480)
 April – Jerzy Radziwiłł, Polish nobleman (b. 1480)
 April 21 – James, Duke of Rothesay, Scottish prince (b. 1540)
 April 24 – Celio Calcagnini, Italian astronomer (b. 1479)
 April 29 – Johann Gramann, German theologian (b. 1487)
 May 27 – Margaret Pole, 8th Countess of Salisbury (executed) (b. 1473)
 June 26 – Francisco Pizarro, Spanish conquistador (b. c. 1475)
 July 4 – Pedro de Alvarado, Spanish conquistador (b. 1495)
 August – Juan de Valdés, Spanish religious writer (b. 1500)
 August 1 – Simon Grynaeus, German scholar and theologian (b. 1493)
 August 18 – Henry IV, Duke of Saxony (1539–1541) (b. 1473)
 August 19 – Vincenzo Cappello, Venetian admiral and statesman (b. 1469)
 September 24 – Paracelsus, Swiss alchemist and physician (b. 1493)
 September – Beatriz de la Cueva, Governor of Guatemala (b. 1510) 
 October 18 – Margaret Tudor, queen of James IV of Scotland (b. 1489)
 November – Wolfgang Fabricius Capito, German reformer (b. 1478)
 November 30 – Amago Tsunehisa, Japanese warlord (b. 1458)
 December 10 
 Thomas Culpeper, English courtier, lover of Catherine Howard, Queen of England and wife of Henry VIII (executed) (b. c. 1514)
 Francis Dereham, English lover of Catherine Howard (executed)
 December 24 – Andreas Karlstadt, Christian theologian and reformer (b. 1486)
 date unknown
 Jean Clouet, French miniature painter (b. 1480)
 Margareta von Melen, Swedish noblewoman (b. 1489)
 Gül Baba, Ottoman dervish poet
 Giovanni Guidiccioni, Italian poet (b. 1480)
 Gazi Husrev-beg, Ottoman statesmen (b. 1480)

References